Castle Downs may refer to:

 Castle Downs, Cornwall, the site of an important hillfort in Cornwall, England
 Castle Downs, Edmonton, a suburb of Edmonton, Canada